The canton of Brazey-en-Plaine is an administrative division of the Côte-d'Or department, eastern France. It was created at the French canton reorganisation which came into effect in March 2015. Its seat is in Brazey-en-Plaine.

It consists of the following communes:
 
Aubigny-en-Plaine
Auvillars-sur-Saône
Bagnot
Bonnencontre
Bousselange
Brazey-en-Plaine
Broin
Chamblanc
Charrey-sur-Saône
Chivres
Échenon
Esbarres
Franxault
Glanon
Grosbois-lès-Tichey
Jallanges
Labergement-lès-Seurre
Labruyère
Lanthes
Laperrière-sur-Saône
Lechâtelet
Losne
Magny-lès-Aubigny
Montagny-lès-Seurre
Montmain
Montot
Pagny-la-Ville
Pagny-le-Château
Pouilly-sur-Saône
Saint-Jean-de-Losne
Saint-Seine-en-Bâche
Saint-Symphorien-sur-Saône
Saint-Usage
Samerey
Seurre
Tichey
Trouhans
Trugny

References

Cantons of Côte-d'Or